The N11 is a national route in South Africa which runs from the Botswana border at Groblersbrug, through Mokopane, Middelburg, Ermelo and Newcastle to end at the N3 just after Ladysmith.

Route

Limpopo
The N11 begins at the Groblersbrug Border with Botswana (Grobler's Bridge in English) on the Limpopo River. On the Botswana side of the Limpopo River, the border is known as Martin's Drift.

It begins by running south-east through Limpopo province for 190 kilometres to Mokopane. Just before entering Mokopane, the N11 is joined by the R518 and they form one road into Mokopane Central.

At the junction with the R101 Road (Thabo Mbeki Drive), the N11 and the R518 join the R101 southwards. At the second junction afterwards (by Mokopane Mall), the R518 becomes its own road eastwards towards Zebediela, leaving the R101 and the N11 as the road southwards (Thabo Mbeki Drive). After 11 kilometres, the N11 becomes its own road towards the south-south-east and meets the N1 Highway (southbound only) at the next junction just north of the N1's Nyl Toll Plaza.

The N11 continues southwards for 72 kilometers to reach an intersection with the R33 Road. They become one road southwards into the town of Marble Hall (15 kilometres), where they meet the north-eastern terminus of the R573 from Pretoria and KwaMhlanga. The R33 and N11 remain as one road for another 27 kilometres south into the town of Groblersdal.

At the junction with the north-eastern terminus of the R25 Road (4-way junction; staggered junction) in Groblersdal, the R33 becomes the road eastwards, leaving the N11 as the road southwards. The N11 continues southwards for 85 kilometers, following the Olifants River, to cross into the Mpumalanga Province and reach the city of Middelburg.

Mpumalanga
It enters the city of Middelburg as Walter Sisulu Street. At the junction with Cowen Ntuli Street, the N11 meets the R555 and the R104 and they all become the road eastwards on Cowen Ntuli Street, which is the main road through Middelburg Central.

Just after meeting the R35 Road's northern terminus, the R555 becomes its own road north-eastwards, leaving the R104 and N11 as the road eastwards. Just after the Eastdene Suburb, the N11 splits from the R104 to become the road towards the south-east. After the Nazareth and Rockdale suburbs, it meets the N4 Highway (Pretoria-Maputo Highway; Maputo Corridor). The N11 proceeds south-south-east for 55 kilometres to the town of Hendrina, where it passes through the town as Church Street and intersects with the R38 road (Beukes Street) in the town centre. It proceeds south-east for 50 kilometres to the city of Ermelo, where it meets the N17 from Eswatini (Swaziland).

At the Fourie Street junction, the N17 joins the N11 southwards up to the junction with Joubert Street, where the N17 continues westwards. At Voortrekker Street south of Ermelo town centre, the N11 meets the terminus of the N2 from St. Lucia and Durban. From Ermelo, the N11 runs south for 97 kilometres, through Amersfoort (where it meets the R35 Road again), to the town of Volksrust, where it meets the south-eastern terminus of the R23 Road and becomes the Laing's Nek Pass. Just after, the N11 enters KwaZulu-Natal.

KwaZulu-Natal
From Volksrust, the N11 proceeds south for 45 kilometres to reach the city of Newcastle. Just before Newcastle, the N11 is joined by the R34 for 7 kilometres until they split at an off-ramp north-east of the city centre, where the N11 becomes the Newcastle Eastern Bypass. After bypassing the city centre, the N11 proceeds south for 95 kilometres as the Ikhupe Pass, meeting the western terminus of the R68 (which connects to Dundee), to reach the city of Ladysmith. It turns westwards in the city centre and crosses the Klip River to reach an off-ramp intersection with the R103 Road adjacent to the Ladysmith Airport entrance. The N11 joins the R103 and they are one road south-south-west for 2 and a half kilometers before the N11 becomes its own road westwards. The N11 heads westwards for 13 kilometres, meeting the north-eastern terminus of the R600 (which connects to Winterton), to reach its end at an off-ramp junction with the N3 Highway just south of the N3's Tugela Toll Plaza. West of this junction, it is known as the R616 to Bergville.

Road Status
The N11 is an alternate route between Limpopo and KwaZulu-Natal to the N3 freeway. (Avoiding Pretoria and Johannesburg; avoiding Gauteng Province; being an alternative national route towards Botswana and Zimbabwe when coming from the port of Durban) (while the route through Gauteng has tollgates and e-tolls, the N11 is toll-free)

References

External links

 South African National Roads Agency
 Route listing
 An old-fashioned (free) National Road | Travels with Akela

National Roads in South Africa
Roads in South Africa